Ada Gertrude Paterson (6 June 1880 – 26 August 1937) was a New Zealand school medical doctor, child health administrator and community worker.

Early life and education 
Paterson was born in Dunedin, New Zealand, in 1880. She graduated from the University of Otago in 1906, and subsequently travelled to the University of Dublin for further training.

Career 
She returned to New Zealand and commenced practicing medicine in Picton. Paterson was appointed a Medical Inspector of Schools in 1912, initially based in Dunedin but then in Wellington from 1916. She was one of the four women doctors in the School Medical Service: the others were Dr Margaret McCahon in Auckland, Dr Eleanor McLaglan in Christchurch and Dr Emily Irwin in Dunedin. In 1923 Paterson was promoted to Director of the School Hygiene Division of the Department of Health.

In 1935 Paterson represented New Zealand at a conference associated with the League of Nations held in Geneva.

She was dedicated to working for the welfare of children. Her obituary recorded that 'her wise and sympathetic handling of many of the problems of childhood earned her the esteem and affection of many generations of school children and their parents, as well as the confidence of the educational authorities'.

Community activities 
Paterson was the first chairperson of the Wellington District Children's Health Camp Association and was influential in the running of the Ōtaki Children's Health Camp. She was also involved with the kindergarten movement. She was a member of the New Zealand Women's University Federation and served on that organisation's committee.

Death and funeral 
Paterson died on 26 August 1937 in Wellington. Her funeral and cremation were held on 28 August 1937.  Her pallbearers included the Minister of Health Peter Fraser, the Director General of Health Michael Watt, the Director-General, Mental Hospitals Department Dr T. Gray and the Director of Education T. N. Lambourne.  Her ashes are buried at her family plot in the Northern Cemetery in Dunedin.

References

1880 births
1937 deaths
People from Dunedin in health professions
New Zealand women medical doctors
Burials at Dunedin Northern Cemetery
University of Otago alumni
New Zealand public servants